Rhinthon is a genus of skippers in the family Hesperiidae.

Species
Recognised species in the genus Rhinthon include:
 Rhinthon bajula (Schaus, 1902)
 Rhinthon braesia (Hewitson, 1867)
 Rhinthon cubana (Herrich-Schäffer, 1865)
 Rhinthon molion Godman, 1901
 Rhinthon osca Plötz, 1882

Former species
Rinthon [sic] advena Draudt, 1923 - transferred to Tricrista advena (Draudt, 1923)

References

Natural History Museum Lepidoptera genus database

Hesperiinae
Hesperiidae genera